Raúl Rodríguez Navas (born 11 May 1988) is a Spanish professional footballer who plays as a central defender for CD Mirandés.

Club career
Born in Seville, Andalusia, Navas played youth football with local Sevilla FC, making his senior debut in 2007–08 season with the C team in the Tercera División. On 30 May 2009 he played his first professional match, appearing with the reserves in a 0–4 Segunda División home loss against CD Tenerife and also being sent off.

Navas signed with Real Valladolid in July 2009, initially being assigned to the B side. On 16 May 2010, the day the Castile and León club certified its relegation, he made his La Liga debut, starting the 4–0 away defeat to champions FC Barcelona. In his second year, he appeared in a further five official games with the first team, being released in August 2011.

In the following years, Navas competed in the Segunda División B, with Celta de Vigo B and SD Eibar. He achieved two consecutive promotions with the latter, in 2013 and in 2014.

On 12 July 2014, Navas signed a one-year deal with Real Sociedad, being immediately loaned back to Eibar. He was also utilised in the latter's top-flight debut on 24 August, starting in a 1–0 home victory over his parent club.

Navas scored his first goal in the Spanish top tier on 8 December, the third in a 5–2 home rout of UD Almería. On 3 June 2015, the Txuri-urdin activated a clause in his contract and extended his link until 2018. He missed the entire season, due to a pubalgia ailment.

On 14 August 2019, Navas joined CA Osasuna on a season-long move, with an obligatory buyout clause at the end of the loan. He terminated his contract with the club on 26 January 2021, and immediately moved to second division side FC Cartagena on a 18-month deal just hours later.

On 19 July 2021, Navas signed a 1+1 deal with UD Las Palmas also in the second tier, after exercising the rescision clause on his previous contract. He terminated his link on 1 September 2022, and agreed to a one-year contract at CD Mirandés just hours later.

References

External links
Real Sociedad official profile

1988 births
Living people
Spanish footballers
Footballers from Seville
Association football defenders
La Liga players
Segunda División players
Segunda División B players
Tercera División players
Sevilla FC C players
Sevilla Atlético players
Real Valladolid Promesas players
Real Valladolid players
Celta de Vigo B players
RC Celta de Vigo players
SD Eibar footballers
Real Sociedad footballers
CA Osasuna players
FC Cartagena footballers
UD Las Palmas players
CD Mirandés footballers